B. Rush Bricken (born August 4, 1951) is an American banker and politician from the state of Tennessee. A Republican, Bricken has represented the 47th district of the Tennessee House of Representatives, based in Tullahoma and McMinnville, since 2019.

Early life
Bricked was born in 1951, and was one of five children. He received a BS from Auburn University in 1973 and later, while working in banking, an MBA from the Vanderbilt University Owen School of Management.

Career
Bricken has spent most of his career as a banker, also working as a CPA in the 1990s and early 2000s. Since 2010, he has been the CEO of Coffee County Bank in Manchester. He has also served as a Coffee County Commissioner since 1988.

In 2017, Bricken announced he would run for the 47th district of the Tennessee House of Representatives, which was left open after incumbent Judd Matheny announced his campaign for Tennessee's 6th congressional district. Bricken narrowly won the Republican primary election over Ronnie Holden and proceeded to win the general election in a landslide over Democrat Mike Winton. He was sworn in on January 8, 2019.

Personal life
Bricken lives in Tullahoma with his wife, Belinda; they have four children and four grandchildren.

References

Living people
Republican Party members of the Tennessee House of Representatives
21st-century American politicians
1951 births
Auburn University alumni
Vanderbilt University alumni
People from Tullahoma, Tennessee